Tommaso Ceva (December 20, 1648 – February 3, 1737) was an Italian Jesuit mathematician from Milan.  He was the brother of Giovanni Ceva. His work aided in spreading a knowledge of Newton's discovery of the law of gravitation.

Biography 
From a wealthy Milanese family, Ceva entered the Society of Jesus in 1663. He taught mathematics and rhetoric at the Jesuit College of Brera in Milan for thirty-eight years. His most famous student was Giovanni Girolamo Saccheri. He was one the main representatives of Celia Grillo Borromeo's Academia Vigilantium. Joseph I named Ceva Caesarian Theologian early in the 18th century. His first scientific work, De natura gravium (1669), dealt with physical subjects - such as gravity and free fall - in a philosophical way. His only mathematical work, published in 1699 was the Opuscula Mathematica which dealt with geometry, gravity and arithmetic. Ceva designed an instrument to divide a right angle into a specified number of equal parts. He was also a noted poet and dedicated a significant amount of his time to this task. He was made a fellow of the Arcadia in 1718 and was in correspondence with Vincenzo Viviani and Luigi Guido Grandi. He was a close friend of the mathematician Pietro Paolo Caravaggio and his son.

He died in Milan in 1737.

Bibliography 

 
 
 
 Ramat, Raffaello, "La critica del padre Ceva," Civiltà moderna, 10 (1938), 385-95, and 11 (1939), 139-66. (Reprinted in Sette contributi agli studi di storia della letteratura italiana, (Florence, 1947), pp. 5-44.
 Canziani, Guido, "Descartes e Gassendi nella Philosophia Novo-antiqua di Tommaso Ceva," in Per una storia critica della scienza, ed. Marco Beretta, Felice Mondella, and Maria Teresa Monti (Bologna: Cisalpino, 1997), 139-64.
 Haskell, Yasmin, "Sleeping with the Enemy: Tommaso Ceva's Use and Abuse of Lucretius in the Philosophia novo-antiqua (Milan, 1704)," in What Nature Does Not Teach Didactic Literature in the Medieval and Earby Modern Periods, ed. Juanita Ruys (Turnhout Brepols, 2008), 497-520.

See also
List of Jesuit scientists
List of Roman Catholic scientist-clerics

External links
 
 
 

1648 births
1737 deaths
Scientists from Milan
17th-century Italian mathematicians
18th-century Italian mathematicians
18th-century Italian Jesuits
17th-century Italian Jesuits
Jesuit scientists